Nasar is 9th-century Byzantine admiral.

Nasar may also refer to:

 Nasar (Pashtun tribe), Pashtun tribe

Surname
 Mustafa Setmariam Nasar (born 1958), suspected al-Qaeda member and writer
 Sardar Yaqoob Khan Nasar (born 1947), Pakistani politician
 Syed Abu Nasar (1932–2012), Professor of Electrical Engineering
 Sylvia Nasar (born 1947), German-born American economist and author

Places
 Nasar, Iran, a village in Razavi Khorasan Province, Iran
 Nasar Rural District, an administrative subdivision of Khuzestan Province, Iran

See also
 Hajar an-Nasar, archeological site
 Nassar (born 1958), Indian actor mainly in Tamil films

Arabic-language surnames